Occupational and Environmental Medicine is a monthly peer-reviewed medical journal which covers research in occupational and environmental medicine. It is published by the BMJ Group and is the official journal of the Faculty of Occupational Medicine of the Royal College of Physicians of London.

The journal was established in 1944 under founding editor-in-chief Donald Hunter as the British Journal of Industrial Medicine and obtained its present title in 1994.

Abstracting and indexing 
The journal is abstracted and indexed by EMBASE, MEDLINE, Scopus, and the Science Citation Index Expanded. According to the Journal Citation Reports, the journal has a 2017 impact factor of 3.965.

References

External links 
 

Occupational safety and health journals
English-language journals
Publications established in 1944
Monthly journals
BMJ Group academic journals
Hybrid open access journals
Academic journals associated with learned and professional societies